Gölcük is a little town and a summer resort in İzmir Province, Turkey. The name of the town means Little lake.

Geography

Gölcük is a part of Ödemiş district which in turn is a part of İzmir Province. It is accessible from Salihli and Ödemiş.

Administration

The municipality of Gölcük has been established in 1968. Gölcük composes one of the two main quarters of the municipality; the other one being Zeytinlik in the plains, closer to Ödemiş. The total winter population of the municipality is merely 1732. But during summer the population reaches much higher values.

Gölcük as a summer resort

Gölcük is a popular summer resort for people from İzmir, Ödemiş etc. Both the lake and the green forest around the village form a picturesque scenery. Most houses belong to people who live in cities and spend hot summer days in Gölcük.

References and notes

External links
http://www.bilgiara.com/bilgi/tfzt-izmir-golcuk/  

Towns in Turkey
Populated places in İzmir Province
Yaylas in Turkey
Ödemiş District